This Side of Paradise is the debut novel by American writer F. Scott Fitzgerald, published in 1920. It examines the lives and morality of carefree American youth at the dawn of the Jazz Age. Its protagonist, Amory Blaine, is an attractive middle-class student at Princeton University who dabbles in literature and engages in a series of romances with flappers. The novel explores the theme of love warped by greed and status-seeking, and takes its title from a line of Rupert Brooke's poem Tiare Tahiti.

Within months of its publication, This Side of Paradise became a cultural sensation in the United States, and reviewers hailed the work as an amazing debut novel. The book went through twelve printings and sold 49,075 copies. It became especially popular among American college students, and the American national press depicted its 23-year-old author as the standard-bearer for "youth in revolt". Overnight, F. Scott Fitzgerald became a household name. His newfound fame enabled him to earn much higher rates for his short stories, and his improved financial prospects persuaded his reluctant fiancée Zelda Sayre to marry him one month later.

With his debut novel, Fitzgerald became the first writer to turn the national spotlight upon the so-called Jazz Age generation.  In contrast to the older Lost Generation to which Fitzgerald and Ernest Hemingway belonged, the Jazz Age generation were those younger Americans who had been adolescents during World War I, and were largely untouched by the conflict's psychological and material horrors. Fitzgerald's novel riveted the nation's attention upon the leisure activities of this hedonistic younger generation and sparked a societal debate over their perceived immorality.

As a consequence of this novel, Fitzgerald became known as "the outstanding aggressor in the little warfare which divided our middle classes in the twenties—warfare of moral emancipation against moral conceit, flaming youth against old guard". When he died in 1940, social conservatives rejoiced over his death. In a column for The New York World-Telegram, critic Westbrook Pegler wrote that Fitzgerald's death recalled "memories of a queer bunch of undisciplined and self-indulgent brats who were determined not to pull their weight in the boat and wanted the world to drop everything and sit down and bawl with them. A kick in the pants and a clout over the scalp were more like their needing."

Synopsis 

Amory Blaine, a young Midwesterner, is convinced that he has an exceptionally promising future. He attends a posh college-preparatory school and later Princeton University. He grows estranged from his eccentric mother Beatrice and becomes the protégé of Monsignor Thayer Darcy, a Catholic priest. During his sophomore year at Princeton, he returns to Minneapolis over Christmas break and encounters Isabelle Borgé, a wealthy, young debutante whom he first met as a boy. They embark upon a romantic relationship.

While at Princeton, he deluges Isabelle with letters and poems, but she becomes disenchanted with him due to his incessant criticism. After his prom, they break up on Long Island. Following their separation, Amory graduates from his alma mater and enlists in the United States Army amid World War I. He is shipped overseas to serve in the trenches of the Western front. While overseas, he learns his mother Beatrice has died and most of his family's wealth has been lost due to a series of failed investments.

After the armistice with Imperial Germany, Amory settles in New York City as it undergoes the birth pangs of the Jazz Age. He becomes infatuated with a cruel and narcissistic flapper named Rosalind Connage. Desperate for a job, Amory is hired by an advertising agency, but he detests the work. Due to his poverty, his relationship with Rosalind deteriorates as she prefers a rival suitor, Dawson Ryder, a man of wealth and status. A distraught Amory quits his job and goes on an alcoholic bender for three weeks until the start of prohibition in the United States.

When Amory travels to visit an uncle in Maryland, he meets Eleanor Savage, an 18-year-old atheist. Eleanor chafes under the religious conformity and gender limitations imposed on her by contemporary society in Wilsonian America. Amory and Eleanor spend a lazy summer conversing about their love. On their final night together before Amory must return to New York City, Eleanor attempts suicide in order to prove her disbelief in any deity, and Amory realizes that he does not love her.

Returning to New York, Amory learns that the fickle Rosalind is engaged to be married to his affluent rival Dawson Ryder. A devastated Amory is further dispirited to learn that his beloved mentor Monsignor Darcy has died. Homeless, Amory wanders from New York City to his alma mater Princeton and, accepting a car ride from a wealthy man driven by a resentful chauffeur, he speaks out in favor of socialism—although he admits he is still formulating his thoughts as he is talking.

Concluding his long argument about their time's political and societal problems, Amory emphasizes his disillusionment with the current era. He announces his hope to stand alongside those who would bring forth fundamental changes to the age. The men in the car denounce his views, but upon learning that one of them was the father to one of his old friends at Princeton and that the son had died in World War I, Amory and the man reconcile, acknowledging mutual respect. It dawns on Amory that his time as a young promising Princetonian man has all been but a wasted dream, and he parts ways with his travel mates amicably.

Continuing his lonesome walk towards Princeton, Amory gradually forsakes the final obsessions about times and people that once constituted fundamental ideologies of his old self. Standing alone and musing at the sight of Princeton's gothic towers, Amory ecstatically yet somberly concludes: "I know myself . . . but that is all."

Major characters 

Most of the characters are drawn directly from Fitzgerald's own life.

 Amory Blaine a Princeton alumnus from the Midwest and later a World War I veteran who has a series of unfulfilling romances with young women. The character is based on Fitzgerald and his failed relationships. The name "Amory" is taken from Fitzgerald's football hero at Princeton, Hobart Amory Baker.
 Isabelle Borgéa wealthy but shallow debutante who becomes Amory's first love. The character is based on Ginevra King, an heiress upon whom Fitzgerald developed a life-long fixation. Like Isabelle and Amory, Fitzgerald met King on Christmas break during his sophomore year at Princeton, and their relationship ended in a similar fashion. Purportedly, "Fitzgerald was so smitten by King that for years he could not think of her without tears coming to his eyes".
 Rosalind Connagea cruel and selfish flapper who becomes Amory's second love. Rosalind is based on Zelda Sayre and, to a lesser extent, on the fictional character of Beatrice Normandy in H. G. Wells' realist novel Tono-Bungay (1909). Mirroring Rosalind's materialistic relationship with Amory, Sayre initially ended her relationship with Fitzgerald due to his lack of financial prospects and his inability to support her privileged lifestyle as an idle Southern belle.
 Eleanor Savagea beautiful 18-year-old atheist whom Amory meets in Maryland. Fitzgerald based Eleanor on Elizabeth Beckwith MacKie, a romantic interest whom he knew briefly. MacKie later commented that "the Eleanor he described only reminded me of how little he really knew me. His Eleanor loved to sit on a haystack in the rain reciting poetry. Forgive me, Scott: if that is the way you wanted it, then you missed the whole idea of what can happen atop a haystack." Fitzgerald also partly based Eleanor on a young love of his mentor Father Sigourney Fay.
 Thayer Darcya Catholic priest who becomes Amory's spiritual mentor. The character is based on Father Sigourney Fay, Fitzgerald's mentor and confidant. While writing This Side of Paradise, Fitzgerald quoted verbatim entire letters sent to him by Father Sigourney Fay. In addition to using Fay's correspondence, Fitzgerald drew upon anecdotes that Fay had told him about his private life, including his failed romances. When reading This Side of Paradise, Fay wrote to Fitzgerald that the use of his own biographical experiences told in confidence to the young author "gave him a queer feeling."
 Beatrice Blainean aging and eccentric matron who is Amory's mother. Based on the mother of one of Fitzgerald's friends.
 Clara Pagea widowed older cousin whom Amory loves, but she doesn't return his affections. Based on Fitzgerald's cousin Cecilia Delihant Taylor.
 Cecilia ConnageRosalind's cynical younger sister who purloins Rosalind's cigarettes. She is jealous of her sister's success with many young men.
 Allenbya heroic football captain at Princeton based on Hobey Baker, the legendary Princeton athlete and military aviator who died during World War I.
 Thomas Parke D'Invilliersa Princeton classmate who has a gift for poetry. He becomes Amory's close friend and confidante of various subjects, among which are literature, love for young beauties, politics and the meaning of the self. D'Invilliers later becomes a journalist, developing his own perspectives as apart from that he shares with Amory. Fitzgerald based D'Invilliers on his friend, poet John Peale Bishop. The character reappears as a fictitious poet in the opening of The Great Gatsby.

Background and composition

Princeton and Ginevra King 

Since childhood, F. Scott Fitzgerald aspired to be a famous novelist. "Three months before I was born," he later wrote, "my mother lost her other two children...I think I started then to be a writer." While attending Princeton University, his passion for writing literature began to solidify into a career choice, and he often wrote fiction as an undergraduate.

During his sophomore year at Princeton, Fitzgerald returned home to Saint Paul, Minnesota during Christmas break where the 18-year-old aspiring writer met and fell in love with 16-year-old Chicago debutante Ginevra King. They began a romantic relationship spanning several years. Although Ginevra loved him, her upper-class family belittled Scott's courtship because of his lower-class status compared to her other wealthy suitors. Rejected by Ginevra as a suitable match, a heartbroken Fitzgerald enlisted in the United States Army amid World War I.

Hoping to have a novel published before his deployment to Europe and his anticipated death in the trenches of World War I, Fitzgerald hastily wrote a 120,000-word manuscript entitled The Romantic Egotist. After obtaining a brief leave from the army in February 1918, Fitzgerald continued work on his unpublished manuscript at Princeton's University Cottage Club's library. Ultimately, eighty-one pages of this revised manuscript would later appear in the final version of This Side of Paradise.

In May 1918, Fitzgerald gave the revised manuscript to his friend Shane Leslie to deliver to Max Perkins, an editor at Charles Scribner's Sons in New York City. Leslie asked the publishing company to retain the manuscript no matter what they thought of it. Although Scribner's rejected the manuscript, the impressed reviewer Max Perkins praised Fitzgerald's novitiate efforts and encouraged him to resubmit the manuscript after extensive revisions.

In June 1918, Fitzgerald was garrisoned with the 45th and 67th Infantry Regiments at Camp Sheridan near Montgomery, Alabama. Attempting to rebound from his rejection by Ginevra, a lonely Fitzgerald began dating Zelda Sayre, a 17-year-old Southern belle and the affluent granddaughter of Confederate senator whose extended family owned the White House of the Confederacy. A romance soon blossomed, although Fitzgerald continued writing Ginevra, asking in vain if there was any chance of resuming their former relationship. Three days after Ginevra married a wealthy Chicago polo player, a lonely Fitzgerald professed his affection for Zelda in September 1918.

Jazz Age and creative struggles 

Upon his army discharge in February 1919, he moved to New York City. He then turned to writing advertising copy to sustain himself while seeking a breakthrough as an author of fiction. Fitzgerald wrote to Zelda frequently, and by March 1920, he had sent Zelda his mother's ring, and the two became officially engaged. However, as he was living in poverty in New York City, Fitzgerald could not convince Zelda that he would be able to support her, and she broke off the engagement in June 1919.

In the wake of Fitzgerald's rejection by Ginevra two years prior, his subsequent rejection by Zelda further dispirited him. Unable to earn a successful living, Fitzgerald publicly threatened to jump to his death from a window ledge of the Yale Club, and he carried a revolver daily while contemplating suicide.

In July 1919, Fitzgerald quit his advertising job and returned to St. Paul. Having returned to his hometown as a failure, Fitzgerald became a social recluse and lived on the top floor of his parents' home at 599 Summit Avenue, on Cathedral Hill. He decided to make one last attempt to become a novelist and to stake everything on the success or failure of a book. Abstaining from alcohol and parties, he worked day and night in his parents' home to revise The Romantic Egotist as This Side of Paradise—an autobiographical account of his Princeton years and his unfulfilling romances with Ginevra, Zelda, and others. Fitzgerald chose the new title based on a line in Rupert Brooke's poem Tiare Tahiti, "Well this side of Paradise!...There's little comfort in the wise."

Fitzgerald sent the revised manuscript to Scribner's on September 4, 1919. Although the manuscript again impressed editor Max Perkins who wished to publish the novel immediately, senior executives at the publishing house overruled Perkins and rejected the novel on the grounds of indecency. An undeterred Perkins threatened to resign from the company unless the work was published. On September 16, Scribner's accepted the novel for publication.

Fitzgerald later recalled his euphoria upon learning his first novel would be published: "The postman rang, and that day I quit work and ran along the streets, stopping automobiles to tell friends and acquaintances about it⁠—my novel This Side of Paradise was accepted for publication. That week the postman rang and rang, and I paid off my terrible small debts, bought a suit, and woke up every morning with a world of ineffable top-loftiness and promise."

Publication and marriage 
This Side of Paradise was published on March 26, 1920, with a first printing of 3,000 copies. The initial printing sold out in three days. Within months of its publication, the 23-year-old author's debut novel became a cultural sensation in the United States, and F. Scott Fitzgerald became a household name. The book went through twelve printings in 1920 and 1921 for a total of 49,075 copies. Initially, the novel did not provide a large income for Fitzgerald. Copies sold for $1.75, for which he earned 10% on the first 5,000 copies and 15% beyond that. In total, in 1920 he earned $6,200 from the book. 

According to Fitzgerald's friend Burton Rascoe, Fitzgerald complained that "the book didn't make me as rich as I thought it would". Nevertheless, Fitzgerald's new fame due to This Side of Paradise enabled him to earn much higher rates for his short stories, and the author could now convince Zelda Sayre to marry him. Zelda resumed her engagement to Fitzgerald on the explicit condition that he could now pay for her privileged lifestyle. However, by the time of their wedding in April 1920, Fitzgerald claimed neither he nor Zelda still loved each other, and the early years of their marriage in New York City proved to be tumultuous and a disappointment.

Critical reception

Literary critics 
Many literary reviewers were enthusiastic about Fitzgerald's debut novel. Burton Rascoe of the Chicago Tribune urged readers to "make a note of the name, F. Scott Fitzgerald. It is borne by a 23 year old novelist who will, unless I am much mistaken, be much heard of hereafter." Rascoe asserted that Fitzgerald's first novel bore "the impress, it seems to me, of genius. It is the only adequate study that we have had of the contemporary American in adolescence and young manhood." "The prize first novel of a decade is F. Scott Fitzgerald's This Side of Paradise," Fanny Butcher raved "a book which...will have a serious and far reaching effect on American literature." In his influential review of the work in The Smart Set, critic H. L. Mencken described This Side of Paradise as "an amazing first novel" and heaped praise upon the young author:

Although critics praised This Side of Paradise as highly original, they eviscerated its form and construction. Lillian C. Ford in the Los Angeles Times complained "the construction is odd and the book has two parts, the first with four chapters and the second with five. The chapters have unexpected topical divisions and when the author feels so inclined he throws his story into drama form and then again it jogs along as plain narrative." 

A critical consensus soon emerged that Fitzgerald's structural craftsmanship left much to be desired. He could write entertainingly, his detractors conceded, but he gave scant attention to form and construction. Having read and digested these criticisms of his debut novel, Fitzgerald sought to improve upon the form and construction of his prose in his next work, The Beautiful and Damned, and to venture into a new genre of fiction altogether.

Princeton backlash 

Despite its widespread success with critics and readers, Princeton's faculty and older alumni reacted with hostility towards This Side of Paradise. Although Professor Christian Gauss of French Literature publicly lauded This Side of Paradise as "a work of art," other Princetonians openly attacked the book in the pages of the Princeton Alumni Weekly, much to Fitzgerald's dismay. In a public letter, Ralph Kent, a senior editor of the Nassau Literary Review, disparaged the work as impugning Princeton's reputation due to its sordid depiction of undergraduate life. A recurrent criticism by Princetonians was that Fitzgerald's best-selling novel had fostered an unfavorable impression of their alma mater as populated by hedonistic degenerates solely interested in idle pleasures.

In a private letter to Fitzgerald dated May 27, 1920, John Grier Hibben, the president of Princeton University from 1912–1932, politely but firmly criticized Fitzgerald's depiction of the university in This Side of Paradise:

In response to Hibben's correspondence, Fitzgerald wrote an apologetic explanation: "I have no fault to find with Princeton that I can't find with Oxford and Cambridge. I simply wrote out of my own impressions, wrote as honestly as I could a picture of its beauty. That the picture is cynical is the fault of my temperament...I must admit however that This Side of Paradise does over accentuate the gaiety and country club atmosphere of Princeton. For the sake of the readers interest that part was much over-stressed, and of course the hero, not being average, reacted rather unhealthily I suppose to many perfectly normal phenomena. To that extent the book is inaccurate." 

Shortly before his death, Fitzgerald recalled how his early happiness of being a published author ended "when Princeton turned on the book—not undergraduate Princeton but the black mass of faculty and alumni. There was a kind but reproachful letter from President Hibben, and a room full of classmates who suddenly turned on me with condemnation...The Alumni Weekly got after my book and only Dean Gauss had a good word to say or me. The unctuousness and hypocrisy of the proceedings was exasperating and for seven years I didn't go to Princeton."

Critical analysis

Innovative style 

For his first novel, Fitzgerald used as his literary templates H. G. Wells' 1909 realist work Tono-Bungay and Sir Compton Mackenzie's 1913 novel Sinister Street, which chronicles a young college student's coming of age at Oxford University.

Although Fitzgerald imitated the plot of these two novels, his debut work differed due to its experimental style. He discarded the stodgy narrative technique of most novels and instead unspooled the plot in the form of textual fragments, letters, and poetry intermingled together, including a passage written in a stream-of-consciousness style. This was largely a result of Fitzgerald's cobbling The Romantic Egotist, his earlier attempt at a novel, together with assorted short stories and poems that he had composed but never published.

This atonal blend of different fictive elements prompted cultural elites to celebrate the young Fitzgerald as a literary trailblazer whose work modernized a staid literature which had lagged "as far behind modern habits as behind modern history." Dorothy Parker later remarked that "This Side of Paradise may not seem like much now, but in 1920 it was considered an experimental novel; it cut new ground."

Prose anomalies 
More so than most contemporary writers of his era, Fitzgerald's authorial voice evolved and matured over time, and each of his novels represented a discernible progression in literary quality. Although he was eventually regarded as possessing "the best narrative gift of the century," this narrative gift was not perceived as immediately evident in This Side of Paradise. Believing that prose had a basis in lyric verse, Fitzgerald initially crafted his sentences entirely by ear and, consequently, This Side of Paradise contains numerous malapropisms and descriptive non sequiturs which irritated readers and reviewers. Reflecting upon these copious defects, critic Edmund Wilson later argued that Fitzgerald's debut work had "almost every fault and deficiency that a novel can possibly have".

Thematic content 

The underlying themes of narcissism in the novel have been examined in a variety of scholarly essays. Scholar Saori Tanaka's essay on narcissism argues that "Amory comes to know himself through Beatrice and his four lovers, which are like five sheets of glass. They are his reflectors...reflecting his narcissism and the inner side."

The first three women in the book allow Amory to dream in a narcissistic way. After participating in the war and losing his financial foundation, the last two women he meets, Rosalind and Eleanor, "make him not dream but awake" in postwar America. "With Beatrice and Isabelle, Amory activates the grandiose self," Tanaka states, "with Clara and Rosalind, he restricts narcissism, and with Eleanor, he gains a realistic conception of the self."

Others have analyzed feminist themes in the work. Scholar Andrew Riccardo views several characters to be feminist templates. Eleanor's character serves as a "love interest, therapeutic friend, and conversational other". Highly educated in discussing poetry and philosophy, "Eleanor not only posits her desires in juxtaposition to the lingering expectations of women in her day but also serves as soothsayer to the demands which would be placed on females".

Legacy and influence 

The impact of Fitzgerald's debut novel This Side of Paradise upon societal mores at the time of its publication has been extensively discussed by scholars and critics. With his debut novel, Fitzgerald became the first writer to turn the national spotlight upon the so-called Jazz Age generation. In contrast to the older Lost Generation to which Fitzgerald and Hemingway belonged, the Jazz Age generation were those younger Americans who had been adolescents during World War I and were largely untouched by the conflict's psychological and material horrors.

Fitzgerald riveted the nation's attention upon the hedonistic activities of their sons and daughters cavorting in the rumble seat of a Bearcat roadster and sparked a societal debate over their perceived immorality. Due to this thematic focus, his works became a sensation among college students, and the American national press depicted him as the standard-bearer for youth in revolt. "No generation of Americans has had a chronicler so persuasive and unmaudlin" as Fitzgerald, critic Burke Van Allen wrote in 1934, and no author was so identified with the generation recorded.

Remarking upon the popular association between Fitzgerald and the flaming youth of the Jazz Age, Gertrude Stein wrote in her memoir The Autobiography of Alice B. Toklas that the author's fiction essentially created this new generation in the public's mind. Echoing this assertion, critics John V. A. Weaver and Edmund Wilson insisted that Fitzgerald imbued the Jazz Age generation with the gift of self-consciousness while simultaneously making the public aware of them as a distinctive cohort.

The perception of Fitzgerald as the chronicler of the Jazz Age hedonism and carefree youth led many societal figures to denounce his writings. Social conservatives such as Heywood Broun decried his use of modern slang and went so far as to claim that Fitzgerald wholly fabricated his depiction of young people engaging in drunken sprees and premarital sex. Fitzgerald publicly ridiculed such criticisms, and he opined that many pundits wished to discredit his works in order to retain their outdated conceptions of American society.

As a result of This Side of Paradise, Fitzgerald became regarded as "the outstanding aggressor in the little warfare which divided our middle classes in the twenties—warfare of moral emancipation against moral conceit, flaming youth against old guard". When he died in 1940, social conservatives rejoiced over his death. In one column for The New York World-Telegram, journalist Westbrook Pegler wrote that Fitzgerald's death a few weeks prior reawakened "memories of a queer bunch of undisciplined and self-indulgent brats who were determined not to pull their weight in the boat and wanted the world to drop everything and sit down and bawl with them. A kick in the pants and a clout over the scalp were more like their needing."

References

Notes

Citations

Works cited

External links 

 
 
 This Side of Paradise at Internet Archive
 

1920 American novels
Modernist novels
Novels by F. Scott Fitzgerald
1920 debut novels
Novels set in Minneapolis
Charles Scribner's Sons books